The 2006 All-Ireland Senior Ladies' Football Championship Final featured  and . Armagh led 1–4 to 0–3 at half-time but a goal from player of the match, Nollaig Cleary, helped Cork to a one-point win.
 It was also the second of five consecutive All-Ireland finals that Cork would win between 2005 and 2009. The Armagh team featured Caroline O'Hanlon, a Northern Ireland netball international.

Match info

Teams

References

!
All-Ireland Senior Ladies' Football Championship Finals
GAA
Cork county ladies' football team matches
Armagh county ladies' football team matches
All-Ireland